Waterville is a Canadian rural community in Carleton County, New Brunswick on Route 590.

History

In 1866, Waterville was a town mostly devoted to farming and lumber, with a population of around 60 families. By 1871 the town had a population of 500, though this had shrunk down to 150 by 1898.

Geography
Waterville is a community located in Wakefield Parish in Carleton County, New Brunswick, Canada. It is located on Route 590. There are three separate settlements: Central Waterville, Upper Waterville, and Lower Waterville. At one time there were also two additional settlements named Rockwell and Walton.

Notable people

See also
List of communities in New Brunswick

References

Communities in Carleton County, New Brunswick